The Diepholz Airfield Circuit was an auto racing circuit in the south-west of the town of Diepholz, Germany. It was a temporary circuit on a military airfield, which is still in use by the German military today.

The full length of the runway was used as part of the circuit with a fast double chicane and the start/finish straight which included a temporary pit lane going down one side of the runway. There were no pit garages or permanent racing related buildings on site. Racing first took place at Diepholz in 1968, due to a lack of permanent circuits in Germany. Used mainly for Touring car racing, Diepholz was a regular venue on the calendar for the DTM series. When the DTM, then known as the FIA International Touring Car Championship, collapsed at the end of 1996, there was little use for the circuit. 

The circuit was very similar to those at Burke Lakefront Airport and Edmonton City Centre Airport.

Lap records 

The official race lap records at the Diepholz Airfield Circuit are listed as:

External links
Diepholz at e-tracks

References

Defunct motorsport venues in Germany
Diepholz (district)
Sports venues in Lower Saxony